Tres tristes tigres, abbreviated as TTT, is the debut novel by Cuban writer Guillermo Cabrera Infante. The novel was first published in Spain in 1967. It was later translated into English by Donald Gardner and Suzanne Jill Levine and published in 1971 as Three Trapped Tigers.

It is considered a classic of the Latin American Boom.

Background
After Fidel Castro came to power in Cuba in 1959, writer Guillermo Cabrera Infante, who had supported the Cuban Revolution, became a cultural leader. He was appointed as director of Lunes de Revolución, a weekly literary supplement to the Cuban magazine Revolución. Cabrera Infante's relations with the Castro regime deteriorated and the literary supplement was shut down by the government in 1961. In 1962, he was sent to Belgium to serve as a cultural attaché to the Cuban embassy in Brussels.

It was in Brussels that Cabrera Infante wrote the first manuscript of what would become Tres tristes tigres.  Cabrera Infante's manuscript novel, titled Vista de amanecer en el trópico, won the 1964 Premio Biblioteca Breve, a literary award given by the Spanish publisher Editorial Seix Barral to the best unpublished novel in the Spanish language. Mario Vargas Llosa was one of the jurors of the award at the time. In 1965, Cabrera Infante returned to Cuba upon learning that his mother was ill. However, he did not arrive in time before her death and instead attended her funeral. When he attempted to fly back to Belgium with his two daughters, he was detained by authorities for four months without explanation. He eventually left Cuba, and went into exile in Spain followed by London. Tres tristes tigres was written before 1968, the year Cabrera Infante publicly disassociated himself from the Cuban regime with an interview by Tomás Eloy Martínez for the Argentine weekly Primera Plana.

After winning the Premio Biblioteca Breve, the novel underwent the process of censorship by the government of Francisco Franco. In 1965, Cabrera Infante was able to revise the galley proofs of the novel and decided to rewrite several passages. The novel was originally intended for publication in 1965 but, for this reason, the printing of Vista de amanecer en el trópico was delayed for a few years and ultimately retitled Tres tristes tigres.

In early 1967, the novel was finally published in Barcelona by Editorial Seix Barral with some resistance from Cabrera Infante due to the twenty-two instances of censorship carried out by Francoist censors. These deletions were not replaced in the successive editions in Spanish. However, the deleted passages were finally restored in 1990 when Cabrera Infante completely revised his book, restoring it for the collection of the Biblioteca Ayacucho in Venezuela.

The novel's title is taken from a classic Spanish-language tongue-twister.

Summary
The novel is set in 1958 and centers around three young people within the nightlife of pre-revolutionary Havana. It is intentionally written in the Cuban Spanish vernacular. It has been described as a book in which language is the protagonist. It is a highly experimental, Joycean novel, playful and rich in literary allusions. Cabrera Infante intended to do for Cuban Spanish what Mark Twain had done for American English, recording the great variety of its colloquial variations.

Reception
In his review for The New York Times, David Gallagher praised the English translation and its humor, calling it "one of the most inventive novels" to come out of Latin America.

Translations
The novel has been translated into several languages, including into Japanese by Ryukichi Terao. The English translation was written by Donald Gardner and Suzanne Jill Levine and published in 1971 as Three Trapped Tigers.

Awards
The novel won the Prix du Meilleur Livre Étranger in 1970, for Albert Bensoussan's translation of the novel into French. Bensoussan's translation was published as Trois tristes tigres by Éditions Gallimard in 1970.

Adaptations

In 1967, the novel was adapted into a play of the same name by Chilean playwright Alejandro Sieveking. In 1968, Sieveking's play was in turn adapted into the film of the same name by Chilean director Raúl Ruiz.

Further reading

English
 Cabrera Infante's Tres tristes tigres: the trapping effect of the signifier over subject and text / Hartman, Carmen Teresa., 2003
 A critical study of Tres tristes tigres by Guillermo Cabrera Infante / C.A.H.J Scheybeler., 1977

Spanish
 Guillermo Cabrera Infante y Tres tristes tigres / Reynaldo L Jiménez., 1977
 La nueva novela hispanoamericana y Tres tristes tigres / José Sánchez-Boudy., 1971

References

1967 novels
1967 debut novels
20th-century Cuban novels
Fiction set in 1958
Novels set in Havana
Spanish-language novels
Censored books
Censorship in Spain
1967 in Spain
Novels adapted into plays
Metafictional novels
Novels set in the 1950s
Seix Barral books